uMkhanyakude is the northernmost of the 11 districts of the KwaZulu-Natal province of South Africa. Its seat is Mkuze. It is a very rural district, the largest town being Mtubatuba in the south, with Hluhluwe, Mkuze, Jozini, Kwangwanase and Ingwavuma further to the north. The majority of its 573,353 people speak IsiZulu (2001 Census). The district code is DC27.

uMkhanyakude is named after the yellow-barked fever tree, literally meaning “seen from afar”. It contains many areas of outstanding natural beauty such as the St Lucia greater wetland park, Sodwana Bay and Kosi Bay. Game parks include Hluhluwe-Umfolozi, Ndumu and Tembe Elephant Park.

It is one of the two most deprived districts in South Africa according to the District Health Barometer. “Deprivation” is defined as a combination of indicators including unemployment rates, access to piped water and electricity, female-headed households with high numbers of children and low education levels, according to the Health Systems Trust which produces the Barometer.

Geography

Neighbours
uMkhanyakude is surrounded by:
 The republic of Mozambique to the north
 The Indian Ocean to the east
 uThungulu to the south (DC28)
 Zululand to the west (DC26)
 the kingdom of Eswatini to the north-west

Local municipalities
The district contains the following local municipalities:

Demographics
The following statistics are from the 2001 census.

Gender

Ethnic group

Age

Politics

Election results
Election results for Umkhanyakude in the South African general election, 2004.
 Population 18 and over: 274 753 [47.92% of total population]
 Total votes: 150 543 [26.26% of total population]
 Voting % estimate: 54.79% votes as a % of population 18 and over

References

External links
 Umkhanyakude DM official website

District Municipalities of KwaZulu-Natal
Umkhanyakude District Municipality